Charles Whitworth Robert Lloyd was an Anglican priest. Born on 28 June 1879, educated at Christ Church, Oxford and ordained  in 1913, his first post was as Curate at St Thomas, Eccleston.. After this he was Priest in charge of St Martin Dundee  and then of St Paul, Kinlochleven. He was  Dean of Argyll and The Isles from 1933 to 1940.

Notes

1879 births
Alumni of Christ Church, Oxford
Deans of Argyll and The Isles
Date of death unknown